Konstantin Chernov (born 24 December 1967) is a Kazakhstani water polo player. He competed in the men's tournament at the 2000 Summer Olympics.

See also
 Kazakhstan men's Olympic water polo team records and statistics
 List of men's Olympic water polo tournament goalkeepers

References

External links
 

1967 births
Living people
Kazakhstani male water polo players
Water polo goalkeepers
Olympic water polo players of Kazakhstan
Water polo players at the 2000 Summer Olympics
Sportspeople from Karaganda
Asian Games medalists in water polo
Water polo players at the 1994 Asian Games
Water polo players at the 1998 Asian Games
Asian Games gold medalists for Kazakhstan
Medalists at the 1994 Asian Games
Medalists at the 1998 Asian Games
20th-century Kazakhstani people